Kosmy-Pruszki  is a village in the administrative district of Gmina Sońsk, within Ciechanów County, Masovian Voivodeship, in east-central Poland.

The village has a population of 58.

References

Kosmy-Pruszki